The Waipawa by-election of 1930 was a by-election for the rural Hawke's Bay electorate of Waipawa held on 8 October of that year during the 23rd New Zealand Parliament. The by-election resulted from the death of the previous member George Hunter on 20 August.

It was held on the same day as another by-election in Western Maori.

Candidates
The by-election was won by Albert Jull, of the United Party. Jull had previously contested the seat unsuccessfully in 1911, 1914 and 1919 for United's predecessor, the Liberal Party. The rural seat was usually safe for the rural focused Reform Party. Reform chose William Tucker from Clive as their candidate, although he was unsuccessful.

Result
The following table gives the election results:

References

Waipawa 1930
Waipawa By-Election, 1930
Politics of the Hawke's Bay Region